Torben Frank (born 16 June 1968 in Copenhagen) is a Danish former footballer, who played in the striker role. He most successfully played for Danish clubs Lyngby Boldklub and Brøndby IF, and won four Danish championships. In addition, Frank received 5 international caps for the Denmark national football team and was a part of the Danish team that won the 1992 European Championship.

Frank started playing football for Vallensbæk IF. In 1986, he signed his first contract with Brøndby IF, with whom he went on to win three Danish championships. He moved to league rivals Lyngby Boldklub in January 1991. In April, he made his debut for the Danish national team, in a friendly match against Bulgaria, and was a part of the Danish championship winning Lyngby team in 1992. He was selected to represent Denmark at the 1992 UEFA European Championship, and played in two of five games, as Denmark won the tournament.

After Euro 92, Frank moved abroad to play for Olympique Lyonnais in France. He was injured during preliminary physical tests in Lyon, and never got to play for the club. Lyon wanted out of the contract, and a legal battle between club and FIFA ensued. In 1995, Frank moved on, returning to Lyngby, but never recovered his form prior to the injury. He went on to play for Boldklubben Frem in 1997, and ended his career in 1998.

Honours
Danish Championship : 1987, 1988, 1990 and 1992
1992 European Championship

External links
Danish national team profile
Danish Superliga statistics
Boldklubben Frem profile 
ShowStars profile 

1968 births
Living people
Danish men's footballers
Denmark international footballers
Association football forwards
Brøndby IF players
Lyngby Boldklub players
Olympique Lyonnais players
Boldklubben Frem players
Køge Boldklub players
UEFA Euro 1992 players
UEFA European Championship-winning players
Footballers from Copenhagen